Anonaine is a bioactive benzylisoquinoline alkaloid, present in members of the plant families Magnoliaceae and Annonaceae It is named after the plant it was first extracted from, Annona reticulata, which is commonly known as Anona.

Extraction from Annonaceae
The alkaloid was first isolated from the bark of the Annona reticulata. It has since been found in Annona squamosa, the leaves of Michelia × alba, Fissistigma latifolium and Goniothalamus australis, among many others. The compound may be obtained by dry roasting the bark of Annona reticulata and extracting with methanol. The methanol is removed and the resulting syrup is then treated with hydrochloric acid and the insoluble salts filtered off. The filtrate can then made basic with NH4OH and extracted with diethyl ether. Shaking the extract with 5% sodium hydroxide and retaining the organic layer removes the phenolic content of the extract. The hydrogen chloride salt is then obtained by mixing with hydrochloric acid and recrystallized from diethyl ether. The free base can then be obtained. The anonaine content of Annona reticulata is approximately 0.12%, based on the weight of the starting dried bark.

Research

Traditional medicines
Anonaine is found in many species of Annonacae, which have been used as traditional medicines for many years. For example, extracts of Annona squamosa have been used as treatments for epilepsy, dysentery, cardiac problems, worm infection, constipation, bacterial infection, fever and ulcers. It appears, however, that anonaine is not active in the treatment of many of these ailments. Studies into the bioactivity of anonaine have revealed various interesting pharmacological activities including antitumour, vasorelaxation, antioxidative, antiparasitic and antimicrobial effects, as well as having an effect on the central nervous system.

Anti-tumour properties
Anonaine is known to inhibit growth in human cervical cancer and human lung carcinoma H1299 cells in vitro. The mechanism by which anonaine induces apoptosis in these cells is believed to occur by several mechanisms: generation of nitric oxide and reactive oxygen species, reduction in intracellular glutathione concentration, activation of caspases and apoptosis-related proteins, and damage to DNA.

See also
 Apomorphine – a related chemical used in the treatment of Parkinson's disease
 Aporphine – the core alkaloid
 Nuciferine
 Pukateine

References

Aporphine alkaloids
Dibenzoquinolines